A Legendary Christmas is the sixth studio album and first Christmas album by American singer John Legend, it was released on October 26, 2018. Featuring artists such as Esperanza Spalding and Stevie Wonder, the album was promoted by a tour of the same name from November to December 2018. It received a nomination for Best Traditional Pop Vocal Album at the 2020 Grammy Awards.

Background
The album is Legend's first holiday album, which he announced on October 1, 2018, via social media. His tweet wrote "This winter, get ready for A Legendary Christmas! I have a brand new Christmas album coming out accompanied by #ALegendaryChristmas Tour!". Prior to the album's announcement, Legend had just become the first African-American male to win an EGOT – an Emmy, a Grammy, an Oscar and a Tony. Legend has previously said of his intention to create a Christmas album, he said "I just made a new Christmas album. I've wanted to do this for a long time." On October 11, 2018, Legend premiered two lead singles from the album, "Bring Me Love" and "Have Yourself a Merry Little Christmas" simultaneously on VEVO. The album was re-released on November 8, 2019 with four additional tracks.

Composition
Wonder features on the first song, "What Christmas Means to Me", in which he plays the harmonica, while Spalding sings on "Have Yourself a Merry Little Christmas". Featuring fourteen songs, the album is composed of eight that are "Christmas classics" and six that are original tracks by Legend. The album is executive-produced by neo-soul singer/producer Raphael Saadiq. All string arrangements by Matt Jones, including "Happy Xmas (War Is Over)" on the Super Deluxe Edition which featured an improvised solo by violinist Scott Tixier.

Commercial performance
In John Legend's home country of the United States, A Legendary Christmas debuted at number 26 on the Billboard 200 with 20,000 album-equivalent units, which included 19,000 pure album sales. Eventually, the album rose to 22

Track listing
All tracks produced by Raphael Saadiq.

Notes 
 "Baby, It's Cold Outside" contains additional writing by John Legend and Natasha Rothwell.

Charts

Weekly charts

Year-end charts

Certifications

References

2018 Christmas albums
John Legend albums
Albums produced by John Legend
Albums produced by Raphael Saadiq
Christmas albums by American artists
Columbia Records Christmas albums
Contemporary R&B Christmas albums